New Brighton is an unincorporated settlement on the southwest side of Gambier Island in the Howe Sound region of British Columbia, Canada. It is the main wharf and settlement area on the island. The other named community on the island is Gambier Harbour, to its east.

History
A post office operated at New Brighton from 1919 to 1945.

References

Unincorporated settlements in British Columbia
Populated places in the Sunshine Coast Regional District
Gambier Island